Freedom Foundation may refer to:

 The Freedom Foundation (Washington) located in Olympia, Washington, formerly known as the Evergreen Freedom Foundation
 The Freedoms Foundation located in Valley Forge, Pennsylvania

See also